Luzhniki may refer to:
 Luzhniki (village), a village (selo) in Moscow Oblast, Russia
 Luzhniki Olympic Complex, a sport complex in Moscow, Russia
 Luzhniki Palace of Sports, an arena in Luzhniki Olympic Complex
 Luzhniki Small Sports Arena, an arena in Luzhniki Olympic Complex
 Luzhniki Stadium, a stadium in Luzhniki Olympic Complex
 Luzhniki (Moscow Central Circle), a train station nearby the complex